Palletoori Monagadu is a 1983 Telugu-language film directed by S. A. Chandrasekhar and produced by Midde Rama Rao. The film stars Chiranjeevi and Raadhika. The film, had musical score by K. Chakravarthy. The film was a remake of director's own Tamil film Nenjile Thunivirunthal.

Plot
The movie opens with the murder of a Doctor who tries to set up his medical practice in a village. Everyone knows that the Zamindar of that village is behind that murder. He doesn't like the villagers to get exposed to better things, as he fears they might get out of his control. Enters Dr Santhi (Radhika), who is determined to complete her father's incomplete dream. She meets Rajanna, who will be very helpful and cooperative to her. But, zamindar has his cruel intentions. He plans to kill Dr Santhi also, but Rajanna saves her. Rajanna foils every attempt on her life and in the end, Rajanna manages to help Dr.santhi to run her practice smoothly by bringing zamindar to justice.

Cast
Chiranjeevi as Raja/Rajanna
Raadhika as Rani/Dr. Santhi
Maruthirao Gollapudi
R. Narayana Murthy
Suthivelu
Poornima

Soundtrack 
"Paluke Bangarama" - S. P. Balasubrahmanyam, P. Susheela
"Akkum Bakkum" - S. P. Balasubrahmanyam, P. Susheela
"Jadaloni Banthi Puvvu" - S. P. Balasubrahmanyam, P. Susheela
"Evvaroi Peddhollu" - S. P. Balasubrahmanyam
"Gundegadhi Khaali" - S. P. Sailaja, N. Raja

References

1983 films
1980s Telugu-language films
Films scored by K. Chakravarthy
Telugu remakes of Tamil films